Hehekou is a township of Pingshan County in the Taihang Mountains of western Hebei province, China, located about  from the border with Shanxi and  northwest of the county seat, as the crow flies. , it has 21 villages under its administration.

See also
List of township-level divisions of Hebei

References

Township-level divisions of Hebei
Pingshan County, Hebei